The following highways are numbered 258:

Ireland
 R258 regional road

Japan
 Japan National Route 258

United States
 U.S. Route 258
 California State Route 258
 Georgia State Route 258 (former)
 Indiana State Road 258
 Iowa Highway 258 (former)
 K-258 (Kansas highway)
 Kentucky Route 258
 Maryland Route 258
 Minnesota State Highway 258
 Montana Secondary Highway 258
 New Mexico State Road 258
 New York State Route 258
 Ohio State Route 258
 Pennsylvania Route 258
 South Dakota Highway 258
 Tennessee State Route 258
 Texas State Highway 258
 Farm to Market Road 258 (Texas)
 Utah State Route 258
 Wyoming Highway 258